The Foundation for Young Australians (FYA) is an Australian non-profit organisation whose purpose is to back young people with the trust, resources, skills, and connections to make change. The organisation's vision is that young people have the power to beat injustice and transform the future.

History
The FYA has a history of partnering with individuals, organisations and schools. It was formed in 2000 through a partnership between The Queen's Trust (1977–2000) and the Australian Youth Foundation (1987–2000).

In July 2008 an alliance was formed between the Education Foundation and the FYA. The Education Foundation was founded in 1989 by Ellen Koshland with the aim of developing and delivering education programs, community engagement and research to Australian students. The partnership was to establish the FYA as the primary advocate for young Australians.

FYA has previously published research on the future of work, and the challenges young people facing in transitioning between education and employment. In 2012, the FYA calculated that 30% of student who left high school in Year 9 or below were NEET.

A 2014 report by the FYA found that people under the age of 24 were likely to be worse off than their parents, with a 30% unemployment rate and more university debt and spending most income on housing.

In 2020, under new CEO, Nick Moraitis, FYA released an updated three-year strategy, positioning the organisation as a strategic intermediary backing young people with trust, resources, skills and connections to make change.

Initiatives

 The Centre for New Public Education (CPE) (now concluded)
 Change It Up (now concluded)
 High Resolves (now concluded)
 IMPACT (now concluded) 
 Learning Creates Australia (LCA) 
 NAB Schools First (now concluded)
 Safe Schools Coalition Victoria (SSCV) (now concluded)  which has since become the Safe Schools Coalition Australia.
 Worlds of Work (WOW) (now concluded) 
 YLab 
 Young People Without Borders (YPWB) (now concluded)
 Young Social Pioneers

References

External links

Youth organisations based in Australia
Youth-led organizations
Educational institutions established in 1977
1977 establishments in Australia
Organisations based in Melbourne